Lobelia puberula, or downy lobelia, is a perennial herbaceous wildflower in the Bellflower family (Campanulaceae) native to eastern and south central United States. It is the most common blue-flowered Lobelia in the Southeast. It grows in mesic (moderate moisture) to hydric (moist) habitats in sun or partial shade.

Description
Leaves are simple with a toothed margin. The flowers are blue to violet, five-lobed, and bloom from July to October.

Lobelia puberula is similar to two other Lobelia species in to the Eastern United States, Lobelia inflata (Indian tobacco) and Lobelia siphilitica (great lobelia); all display the characteristic "lip" petal near the opening of the flower and the "milky" liquid the plant excretes.

References

puberula
Flora of North America
Plants described in 1803